Ignatius "Frank Pius" Lanzetta was born in Philadelphia, Pennsylvania in 1903. Ignatius had five other brothers, with whom he formed the bootlegging and drug trafficking Lanzetta Brothers gang. He and his brothers were also called "the Lanzetti brothers" due to newspapers relying on incorrect information.

Early life 
Ignatius Lanzetta was born in South Philadelphia, Pennsylvania in 1903 to Italian American parents Michele and Ignatius Lanzetta. Ignatius had five other brothers: Leo, Pius, Willie, Teo, and Lucien; Leo being the oldest and Pius being the second oldest. Ignatius was known to be very handsome and an impeccable dresser..

Prohibition 
His oldest brother Leo formed the Lanzetta Gang with Ignatius and their other brothers in the early 1920s. Ignatius, Leo, and another brother Pius ran the gang. The brothers controlled bootlegging in Little Italy.

They were allied with Italian gangsters Michael Falcone and Louis "Fats" Delrossi and their rivals included: Polish mob boss William Michael Cusick, Sicilian Mafia and Bruno crime family boss Salvatore Sabella, Jewish mob boss Max "Boo Boo" Hoff, and Italian Mafia made man and rival dope peddler and bootlegger Joseph Bruno.

The Lanzetta brothers ran their gang with extreme violence and expanded into drug trafficking and numbers writing.

Personal life 
Ignatius married an Italian named May Siano. They had a son, Warren, and a daughter, Vanna.

Family trouble  
Leo and Ignatius killed rival Joe Bruno on August 18, 1925, at 8th and Catherine Streets. Four days later, as Leo left a barber shop at 7th and Bainbridge Streets, an unknown assailant killed him in retaliation for Bruno's murder.  Sabella was Leo's suspected killer.

Pius was killed in a luncheonette on December 31, 1936 at 726 South Eighth Street.

Willie was found with his head in a burlap bag with a bullet in his brain on July 2, 1939.

Teo was convicted on drug trafficking charges in 1940 and sent to Levenworth Prison.

Conviction 
Along with Delrossi and Falcone, Ignatius was sent to prison in 1936 for breaking New Jersey's "Gangster Law" and released in 1940; even though their sentences (according to C. Ronald Huff in "Gangs in America III") were, "not more than 10 years and not less than 5 years of imprisonment...".

When Ignatius was released in 1940, he fled to Detroit, Michigan with his brother Lucien and their mother.

Television adaption 
In the first season of the HBO series Boardwalk Empire,  Ignatius Lanzetta and his brothers are the inspiration for Nucky Thompson's main rivals the D'Alessio brothers. In the series, Ignatius is the inspiration for Ignacious D'Alessio, the co-leader of the D'Alessio gang. In the series, his brothers are: Leo, Matteo, Lucien, Sixtus, Pius, and another brother in Philadelphia who is a dentist; the brothers also have several more sisters. In the last episode of season one, Ignacious and Pius are killed by freelance killer Richard Harrow with a sawed-off shotgun in November 1920.

References 

1903 births
Year of death missing
Criminals from Philadelphia
American gangsters of Italian descent
American bootleggers
American drug traffickers